Brahmin Tamil is the name of a dialect of Tamil traditionally spoken by Tamil Brahmins. The dialect, largely, uses Classical Tamil along with a heavy proportion of Sanskrit derivatives. According to the linguist Sabari Ganesh, Brahmin Tamil dialect is closest to the Central Tamil dialect, particularly, the variant spoken by the once dominant and highly educated community colloquial spoken Tamil of Vellalars and Mudaliyars.

History 

During the early 1900s, Brahmin Tamil was used as the lingua-franca for inter-caste communication. The principal characters in the Tamil films of the period (1930s and 1940s) also spoke the Brahmin dialect. However, with the rise of the Pure Tamil Movement and the entry of Dravidian ideologues into Tamil cinema in the 1950s, Brahmin Tamil was gradually displaced from public spheres. Today, Brahmin Tamil is used in films and television soaps centred on the Brahmin society. Brahmin Tamil, has however, continued to flourish among the Brahmin community including the expatriates. Often non-Brahmins use this dialect in soaps and films for comic effect while engaging with Brahmins conversationally. And Brahmins effortlessly code switch by speaking the standard Tamil while engaging with non-Brahmins and revert to Brahmin Tamil when conversing among themselves.

The first systematic study of Brahmin Tamil was undertaken by Jules Bloch in 1910. However, the most detailed study was conducted by A K Ramanujan and William Bright in the 1960s. More recent researches on Brahmin Tamil and other socio-dialects have been conducted by Kamil Zvelebil.

Variations 

There are many forms of Brahmin Tamil spoken. Brahmin Tamil, in general, is less influenced by regional dialects than the dialects used by other Tamil communities. The two main regional variations are the Thanjavur and Palakkad sub-dialects. Other sub-dialects include Ashtagrama Iyer Tamil, Mysore Vadama Iyer Tamil, Mandyam Tamil and Hebbar Tamil.

The differences between Thanjavur and Palakkad sub-dialects are:

 In the words ending in m and n preceded by a vowel, the vowel is nasalised, but the nasal stops themselves are not pronounced except when followed by a word beginning with a vowel in the Thanjavur style. In the Palakkad style, the nasal stops in these cases are always pronounced.
 The accent, style and vocabulary of Tamil used by Tamil Brahmins from Palakkad is greatly influenced by Malayalam apart from Sanskrit, while the sub-dialects used in Tamil Nadu borrow only from Sanskrit.

The Iyengars, particularly those outside Tamil Nadu, speak a dialect retaining ancient lexicon from religious texts such as the Naalayira Divya Prabandham.

Differences with standard Tamil

Vocabulary 

Brahmin Tamil varies slightly several standard Tamil. It retains minor adaptations of classical Tamil (Sentamil) words that are no longer in common usage. For instance, ām, a Brahmin Tamil word for "house", is derived from the classical Tamil word agam. It also notably incorporates a plethora of Sanskrit words. This may be observed in the etymology of several words in the Brahmin Tamil lexicon such as namaskaram (greeting), tirtham (water), and bhakshanam (food offering). There are also unique words in the dialect for signifying time, such as kartala to indicate morning. While non-Brahmin Tamils generally tend to use Sanskrit derivatives in their Prakrit form, Brahmins tend to use original Sanskrit. According to Bright and Ramanujan (1964),

The Ramanujan-Bright hypothesis which examined Brahmin Tamil in detail concluded -

Bright attributes these changes to the comparatively high literacy rate of the Brahmin community.

 Nicknames

There are also a few nicknames and sobriquets used in Brahmin Tamil alone.

Structure and pronunciation 

Brahmin Tamil also uses the retroflex approximant |ɻ| used in Old Tamil, but no longer in use in most non-Brahmin dialects.

Usage 

Though mainly used by Tamil Brahmins, the Brahmin dialect is also used occasionally, and to a lesser extent, by other forward caste Tamils such as Vellalars and Mudaliyars. Until the rise of the Self Respect movement, the usage of Brahmin Tamil was favoured by the Vellalars and Mudaliyars of Thanjavur and South Arcot districts. In the early decades of the 20th century, the Brahmin Tamil variant spoken in Madras city was considered to be standard spoken Tamil. However, since the 1950s and the gradual elimination of Sanskrit loan words from the spoken tongue, Brahmin Tamil has fallen into disuse and has been replaced by the Central and Madurai Tamil dialects, by all communities, including most Brahmins, as the preferred spoken dialects for day-to-day use.

In ancient times, Brahmin Tamil was used only by Smartha Brahmins, the Vaishnavite Iyengars having a unique dialect of their own, called the Sri Vaishnava Manipravalam which interested linguistics for its peculiar grammatical forms and vocabulary. However, due to the development of a homogenised Brahmin identity during the medieval period, Vaishnavite Brahmins in the Tamil country have largely assimilated Brahmin Tamil with their own dialect, retaining several words of the Vaishnava Manipravalam in their vocabulary. The Hebbar and Mandyam Iyengars who reside outside the Tamil country, however, continue to use Iyengar Tamil as their mother tongue. So do Ashtagrama Iyers and Mysore Vadama Iyers whose Tamil dialects while largely uses Brahmin Tamil has some Kannada influence. In contrast to peninsular India, the Brahmin dialect was never used by the Tamil Brahmins of Sri Lanka.

The difference between the Smartha and Sri Vaishnava variants are currently limited to vocabulary, particularly to words related to ritual and familial ties, alone.

See also 

 Iyengar Tamil
 Tamil Brahmin
 Sankethi language

Notes

References 

 
 

Tamil dialects